St. Marina's Cave is a cave in Livadhja, Vlorë County, Albania. It is a Cultural Monument of Albania.

References

Cultural Monuments of Albania
Buildings and structures in Finiq
Caves of Albania